Oppana is a popular form of social entertainment among the Mappila (Kerala Muslims) community of Kerala, South India, prevalent throughout Kerala, especially in Malabar. The term Oppana is believed to be originated from the Arabic word "Affna". Oppana is traditionally used in various important cultural ceremonies, and in particular, is a component of all Mappila weddings. In Kerala, this art form has been revived with much popularity on the performing stages of the Youth Festivals of the student community.
Oppana is generally presented by females, numbering about fifteen, including musicians, on a wedding day. The bride dressed in all finery, covered with gold ornaments and her palms and feet adorned with an intricately woven pattern of mylanchi (henna), sits amidst the circle of dancers. She is the chief spectator sitting on a peetam (chair), around which the singing and dancing take place. While they sing, they clap their hands rhythmically and move around, the bride using simple steps. Two or three girls begin the songs and the rest join in chorus.

Sometimes, Oppana is also presented by males to entertain the bridegroom. It usually takes place just before the bridegroom leaves for the bride's residence where the Nikah (marriage) takes place or at the time he enters the Maniyara.
  
Harmonium, tabla, ganjira and elathaalam are the musical instruments employed for this performance. Only the Mappilapaattu will be sung on the occasion. 
  
The word Oppana may have been derived from an Arabic form, Afna. There are two types of Oppana, one is Oppana chayal and another is Oppana murukkam. When Oppana chayal is performed, they do not clap their hands. If it begins with Chayal it would also end with Chayal only.

See also 
 Duff Muttu
 Mappila Paattu
 Kuthu Ratheeb
 Mappila
 Kerala Folklore Akademi

References

External links

Dances of Kerala
Mappilas
Kerala music